Panta Rei or Panta Rhei may refer to:

 Panta rei (Heraclitus), "everything flows", a concept in the philosophy of Heraclitus

Media
Panta Rhei (band), a Hungarian rock band
Panta Rei (Đorđe Balašević album), a studio album by Đorđe Balašević
Panta Rei (Jelena Tomašević album), the debut album of Jelena Tomašević
Panta Rhei (film), a 1952 film by Bert Haanstra
Panta Rei (film), a 2005 film by Nisvet Hrustić
 "Panta Rhei", a trance single (mixed by Armin van Buuren and Mark Sixma) featured A State of Trance 2015
 "Panta Rei", song by Agoria (musician) from "Impermanence" album
 "Panta Rhei", song by Myth & Roid
 Panta Rhei, cycle of performance art by VestAndPage

Other
Panta Rei, a fictional secret society featured in Umberto Eco's novel Foucault's Pendulum
Panta Rhei, a ship operated by Zürichsee-Schifffahrtsgesellschaft on Lake Zurich in Switzerland
Panta Rhei (game engine), a video game engine built by Capcom
Panta Rhei, the name of the Scientific Decade 2013–2022 of the International Association of Hydrological Sciences

See also 
 Hōjōki – Japanese
 Impermanence – Buddhism
 Omnia mutantur, Tempora mutantur – Latin